Nafl or Nafila may refer to:
 Nafl prayer, optional Muslim salah
 Fajr nafl prayer, a surerogatory prayer before Fajr prayer
 Rasm Al-Nafl, a village in Syria